Baan was a vendor of enterprise resource planning (ERP) software that is now owned by Infor Global Solutions. Baan or Baan ERP, was also the name of the ERP product created by this company.

History 
The Baan Corporation was created by Jan Baan in 1978 in Barneveld, Netherlands to provide financial and administrative consulting services. With the development of his first software package, Jan Baan and his brother Paul Baan entered what was to become the ERP industry. The Baan company focused on the creation of enterprise resource planning (ERP) software.

Jan Baan developed his first computer program on a Durango F-85 computer in the programming language BASIC. In the early '80s, The Baan Corporation began to develop applications for Unix computers with C and a self-developed Baan-C language, the syntax of which was very similar to the BASIC language.

Baan rose in popularity during the early nineties. Baan software is famous for its Dynamic Enterprise Modeler (DEM), technical architecture, and its 4GL language. Baan 4GL and Tools is still considered to be one of the most efficient and productive database application development platforms. Baan became a real threat to market leader SAP after winning a large Boeing deal in 1994. It went IPO in 1995 and became a public listed company in Amsterdam and US Nasdaq. Several large consulting firms around the world partnered to implement Baan IV for multi-national companies. It acquired several other software companies to enrich its product portfolio, including Antalys, Aurum, Berclain, Coda and Caps Logistics. Sales growth rate was once claimed to reach 91% per year.

However the fall of the Baan Company began in 1998. The management exaggerated company revenue by booking "sales" of software licenses that were actually transferred to a related distributor.  The discovery of this revenue manipulation led to a sharp decline of Baan's stock price at the end of 1998.

In June 2000, facing worsening financial difficulties, lawsuits and reporting seven consecutive quarterly losses and bleak prospects, Baan was sold at a price of US$700 million to Invensys, a UK automation, controls, and process solutions group to become a unit of its Software and Services Division. Laurens van der Tang was the president of this unit. With the acquisition of Baan, Invensys's CEO Allen Yurko began to offer "Sensor to Boardroom" solutions to customers.

In June 2003, after Allen Yurko stepped down, Invensys sold its Baan unit to SSA Global Technologies for US$ 135 million. Upon acquiring the Baan software, SSA renamed Baan as SSA ERP Ln. In August 2005, SSA Global released a new version of Baan, named SSA ERP LN 6.1.

In May 2006, SSA was acquired by Infor Global Solutions of Atlanta, a major ERP consolidator in the market.

Product version 
Triton 1.0 to 2.2d, 3.0 to last version of Triton is 3.1bx, then the product is renamed to Baan

Baan 4.0  (last version of BaanIV is BaanIVc4 SP30)  & Industry extensions (A&D,...)

Baan 5.0   (last version of BaanV is Baan5.0 c SP26.0)

Baan 5.1, 5.2 (for specific customers only)

SSA ERP 6.1 / Infor ERP LN 6.1 / Infor10 ERP Enterprise / Infor LN

ERP Ln 6.1 FP6, released in December, 2009

ERP Ln 6.1 FP7, released in January, 2011

ERP LN 6.1 10.2.1, released 2012

Infor LN 10.3, released in July, 2013

Infor LN 10.4, released 2015

Infor LN 10.5, released in June, 2016

Infor LN 10.6, released in March, 2018

Infor LN 10.7, released in January, 2020

Infor ERP Ln 6.1 supports Unicode and comes with additional language translations.

Supported platform and database (server) 
Server Platform:

Windows Server, Linux, IBM AIX, Oracle Solaris, HP-UX, OS/400 (Obsolete), OS/390 (Obsolete)

Database:

Oracle Database, IBM DB2, MS SQL Server, Informix (Obsolete since December 2015), MySQL (Obsolete since year 2010), Bisam (Obsolete), Btam (Obsolete)

Standard packages 
Baan IV Packages:

Common (tc), Finance (tf), Project (tp), Manufacturing (ti), Distribution (td), Process (ps), Transportation (tr), Service (ts), Enterprise Modeler (tg), Constraint Planning (cp), Tools (tt), Utilities (tu), Baan DEM (tg)

ERP Ln 6.1 Packages:

PDM BaanIV (ba), Conversion (bc), Enterprise Modeler (tg), Common, Taxation (tc), People (bp), Financials (tf), Project (tp), Enterprise Planning (cp), Order Management (td), Electronic Commerce (ec), Central Invoicing (ci), Manufacturing (ti), Warehouse Management (wh),Freight Management (fm), Service (ts), Quality Management (qm), Object Data Management (dm), Tools (tt), Tools Addons (tl), Development Utilities (du)

Baan Virtual Machine – bshell 
Bshell is the core component of a Baan application server. It is a process on a virtual machine, to run the Baan 4GL language. Bshell was ported to different server platforms which made the Baan program scripts platform independent. For example, a Baan session developed on the Windows platform could be copied to a Linux  platform without re-compiling the application code. Bshell is similar to nowaday's Java VM or .Net CLR.

Fraud 
In 1998 Baan had a class action lawsuit filed against them for violation of the securities exchange act of 1934 held in the United States District Court of Columbia. Baan "...undertook a scheme and course of conduct intended to inflate Baan's results through various financial manipulations". The movie  was based on the events with the Baan brothers in 1998. The end credits indicate that it is not a documentary but fiction and that the makers did not intend to portray individuals and events accurately; However, the similarity with the Baan debacle is obvious.

References

External links 
 Infor

ERP software companies
Barneveld (municipality)
Companies based in Hyderabad, India
Dutch companies established in 1978